Barfussia is a genus of flowering plants belonging to the family Bromeliaceae.

Its native range is Western South America.

Species:

Barfussia laxissima 
Barfussia platyrhachis 
Barfussia wagneriana

References

Tillandsioideae
Bromeliaceae genera